The following is a list of episodes of the anime television series Doraemon (2005 anime).

2010

2011

2012

2013

2014

References

Doraemon (anime)
Doraemon lists
Doraemon